Han Dongjun (born 21 July 1992), also known as Elvis Han, is a Chinese actor.

Early life and education  
Han attended high school in Vancouver, Canada from 2007 to 2011. In 2011, Han was cast to star in the web film Vancouver Rock and Roll. Following his first acting project, Han became interested in performing and acting. Despite his family's wishes for him to study interior design in college, Han decided to return to China to study acting. He entered Shanghai Theatre Academy in 2012.  

Han is also a certified car racer, having received a professional certification from the Federation of Automobile Sports of the People's Republic of China (FASC). Han later played a racer in the sports drama Speed (2018).

Career 
In 2013, Han made his official acting debut in the wuxia drama The Romance of the Condor Heroes. 

In 2015, Han rose to fame for his title role in the hit fantasy period web drama Wu Xin: The Monster Killer. The same year he starred in a well-received supporting turn in modern drama Good Times.

In 2016, Han starred as the male lead in the fantasy action drama Chinese Paladin 5. 

In 2018, Han earned increased recognition for his leading roles in period romance melodrama Siege in Fog, historical drama Secret of the Three Kingdoms where he played Sima Yi and romance drama Never Gone.

Filmography

Film

Television series

Television show

Theater

Discography

Awards and nominations

References

External links

1992 births
Living people
21st-century Chinese male actors
Chinese male stage actors
Chinese male television actors
Male actors from Harbin
Shanghai Theatre Academy alumni
Tangren Media